The National Democratic Party of Tibet is a major party in the Tibetan government in exile, officially the Central Tibetan Administration, based in India.

It was founded on 2 September 1994, but the seeds of the party were planted by the 14th Dalai Lama at a meeting of the Tibetan Youth Congress in 1990. Based on that meeting, leaders of the congress began drawing up a constitution. Mr. TT Karma Chophel was elected the first President of the NDPT, and ten other executive members were chosen.

Structure and activities 

According to the party, its main aim and objectives are to prepare for the establishment of the political parties in a future Tibet, to promote democracy, to educate the Tibetan people about the significance of political parties, and to create awareness among the people about Tibetan issues.

In 2008, the party held workshops on democracy in Tibetan settlements located in remote parts of India, where the Tibetan community was taught about democracy as a value. In the 5th National Convention, the party passed a bill to support Tibetan political science students in different universities.

This party played an important role in arousing political discussions in exile. The party supported Dr. Lobsang Sangay both during the 2011 and 2016 Tibetan Election for Kalon Tripa, now termed Sikyong  (Prime Minister) to head the Central Tibetan Administration. However, in 2016 the party nominated Speaker Penpa Tsering along with Dr. Sangay to provide wider choice to the Tibetan diaspora.

Party leaders 
 TT Karma Chophel (1994–1996)
 Kunga Tsering (1996–1997)
 Acharya Yeshi Phuntsok (1997–2000; 2000–2004)
 TT Karma Chophel (2004–2006)
 Chime Youngdung (2006–2012)
 Gelek Jamyang (2012–2016)
 Tsetan Norbu (2016–2019; 2019–2021)

Opposition 
In May 2011, Tenzin Rabgyal founded the People's Party of Tibet in an effort to bring plurality to the democratic process for Tibetans.

See also 
 Tibetan Communist Party

References

External links 
 
 

 
Banned political parties in China
Banned secessionist parties
Politics of Tibet
Political parties in Tibet
Central Tibetan Administration
Political parties established in 1994
1994 establishments in India
Nationalist parties
Conservative parties
Monarchist parties